Bibalan (also Romanized as Bībālān; also known as Bībālān-e Pā’īn) is a village in Bibalan Rural District, Kelachay District, Rudsar County, Gilan Province, Iran. At the 2006 census, its population was 1,172, in 375 families.

References 

Populated places in Rudsar County